
Year 148 BC was a year of the pre-Julian Roman calendar. At the time it was known as the Year of the Consulship of Magnus and Caesoninus (or, less frequently, year 606 Ab urbe condita). The denomination 148 BC for this year has been used since the early medieval period, when the Anno Domini calendar era became the prevalent method in Europe for naming years.

Events 
 By place 
 Ireland 
 Corlea Trackway built in County Longford

Roman Republic 
 With the defeat of Andriscus in the Battle of Pydna by Quintus Caecilius Metellus Macedonicus, Macedon is reorganized as a Roman province by 146 BC.
 Construction of the Via Postumia, linking Aquileia and Genua.
 Publius Cornelius Scipio Aemilianus divides Numidia among the three sons of the recently deceased Masinissa.

Births

Deaths 
 Liu Rong, Chinese crown prince of the Han Dynasty
 Masinissa, king of Numidia (b. c. 238 BC)
 Yuan Ang, Chinese statesman of the Han Dynasty

References